Cambria Pines is an unincorporated community in San Luis Obispo County, California, United States. Cambria Pines is located along the Pacific coast north of Cambria. It is served by the Pacific Coast Highway.

References

Unincorporated communities in San Luis Obispo County, California
Cambria, California
Unincorporated communities in California